Stenoptilia suprema is a moth of the family Pterophoridae. It is known from Colombia, Ecuador and Peru.

The wingspan is about 26 mm. Adults are on wing in January and August.

External links

suprema
Moths described in 1926
Moths of South America